Richard Coke Marshall Jr. (March 13, 1879 - March 12, 1961) served as an American brigadier general during World War I.

Early life 
Richard Coke Marshall Jr. was born on March 13, 1879, in Portsmouth, Virginia, to Richard Marshall and Kate Wilson Coke Marshall.

He attended the Virginia Military Institute, graduating in 1898.

Military career 
Marshall accepted a commission as a captain with the Fourth United States Volunteer Infantry on June 29, 1898, and served in the Spanish American War.

Marshall resigned from the Regular Army in 1920.  He was appointed as a brigadier general in the Reserve Corps in 1921. Marshall commanded the Reserve's 219th Field Artillery brigade from 1926 until 1930.

Civilian career 
In 1920, Marshall accepted a position as general manager of the Association of General Contractors of America. In 1928, he became president of the Sumner Sollitt Company in Chicago.

Awards 
Marshall received the Army Distinguished Service Medal for his World War I service with the Construction Division.

Personal life
He had a son, Richard C. Marshall III.

Death and legacy 
Marshall died in Washington, D.C., on March 12, 1961. He was buried at Saint Johns Church Cemetery in Hampton, Virginia.

References 

Military personnel from Chicago
Virginia Military Institute alumni
1879 births
United States Army generals of World War I
1961 deaths